The 2017 Festival of World Cups was a series of rugby league World Cups that were held in Sydney, Australia during July 2017.  As part of the festival, there was University World Cup and a Defence Force World Cup. A wheelchair rugby league World Cup was also held in France.

The festival is part of the buildup to the 2017 Women's Rugby League World Cup and the men's 2017 Rugby League World Cup which was held in Australia, New Zealand and Papua New Guinea at the end of 2017.

Universities World Cup
The Universities World Cup was won by Australia. It was their sixth title.

Pool A

Pool B

Finals

Defence Force World Cup
The Defence Force World Cup was won by Fiji. Fiji, who was a last minute replacement when Serbia withdrew, currently hold both the rugby league and rugby union Defence Force titles. 

A women's international defence force series was also held between Australia and New Zealand. Australia won the three match series, 3-0.

Final

Wheelchair World Cup

Seven teams took part in the Wheelchair World Cup with the semi-finalists from 2013 (Australia, England, France and Wales) placed in Group A and Italy, Spain and Scotland in Group B. The hosts, France, won 38–34 in the final against England to retain the title. Australia, who had intended to host the tournament, finished third after defeating newcomers Italy 58–45. Spain, who were also making their first appearance at the world cup, lost 45–66 to Wales in the fifth-place play-off match.

Group stage

source:

Finals

source:

Final

References

Rugby league international tournaments
Festival of World Cups
Festival of World Cups